Streptomyces xishensis is a bacterium species from the genus of Streptomyces which has been isolated from marine sediments from the South China Sea near the Xisha Islands in China.

See also 
 List of Streptomyces species

References

Further reading

External links
Type strain of Streptomyces xishensis at BacDive – the Bacterial Diversity Metadatabase

xishensis
Bacteria described in 2012